Kamal Hachkar (Arabic: كمال هشكار; born 25 February 1977), is a Franco-Moroccan filmmaker, and academic. Kamal is best known as the director of the critically acclaim controversial documentary Tinghir-Jerusalem: The Echoes of the mellah.

Personal life
He was born on 25 February 1977 in Tinghir, Morocco to a Berber family. At the age of just six months, he left Morocco with his mother for France, where his father worked as a worker since 1968. However, he had regular visits to Tinghir during summer vacation. Kamal obtained a master's degree in medieval history of the Muslim worlds at the Sorbonne University. In 2005, he became a teacher after passing certificate of aptitude for teaching secondary education.

Career
In 2013, Kamal made his maiden documentary venture, Tinghir-Jerusalem: Les Échos du mellah. The film sets in time of the French protectorate in Morocco deals with the life and co–habitation of Berber Muslim and Jewish families in Tinghir during the desperate times. Even though, it was a controversial topic in Morocco, which was criticized by Islamists. Later the Justice and Development Party also joined the criticism citing that it as an invitation to normalize relations between Israel. However, the film received critical acclaim and several awards at the Moroccan National Film Festival.

In 2013, the film won Best Documentary Award at Paris International Fantastic Film Festival and then Grand Prix Eden for documentary at Lights of Africa Festival. At the Ashkelon Jewish Eye Festival, the film won Best Documentary Award, whereas it received Grand Prize for Best Documentary and Local and public press award at Nador International Festival of Cinema and Common Memory (FICMEC). In 2015, the film won Pomegranate Awards for Sephardi Excellence in the Arts at New York Sephardic Jewish Film Festival.

Filmography

References

External links
 

1977 births
21st-century Moroccan people
French people of Moroccan descent
Living people
Moroccan film directors